Dayapuram is an institutional campus in Kerala, India. It is named for a part of the village Kattangal, near Kunnamangalam in Kozhikode district. In Malayalam, the word "Dayapuram"  means "the land of kindness".

Institutions
Ansari Orphanage, established in 1984
Dayapuram Residential School (1984)
Madrasathul Mufthah (1984)
Dayapuram Nursery School (1984)
Dayapuram Arts and Science College for women (2002 )
Madurai Kamaraj University Distance Education Center
Dayapuram Juma Musjid, general mosque
Zainab Musjid, a mosque for women only
Dayapuram Library

Hostels
Girls Hostel
Working Woman's Hostel

History
The school was established in 1984 as an English Medium School near to the National Institute of Technology Calicut, (formerly R.E.C. Calicut), their aim was to bring educationally backward situations into the mainstream, especially for orphans. Orphans from all religions are admitted without regard to financial circumstances. Shaik Abdulla Ibrahim Al Ansari, was their main financial source. In 1986, Ansari formally inaugurated Qatar Calendar House and Dayapuram Residential School gets affiliation of the Central Board of Secondary Education, New Delhi in 1986.

Organisation
All institutions are under Al Islam Charitable Trust.

References

External links
 

Schools in Kozhikode district